Fergus Craig (born April 19, 1980) is a British stand-up comic and actor in theatre, television and radio. He studied at the University of Manchester. 
Craig is one half of the double act Colin & Fergus, with actor and writer Colin Hoult.

Career

Between 2004-08 Craig and Hoult performed regularly on the London comedy circuit. They performed three shows at the Edinburgh Festival Fringe, Colin & Fergus '04, Colin & Fergus 2 '05 and Rutherford Lodge '06.

In 2006 Craig played Alan Bennett in Pete and Dud: Come Again, a play by Chris Bartlett and Nick Awde on the life of Peter Cook and Dudley Moore. The play ran at the 2006 Edinburgh Festival Fringe, then transferred to London's West End and toured New Zealand.

In 2007 he joined the cast of Channel 4's Star Stories and was a regular in Series 2 and 3 of the show.

In 2009, he won the Hackney Empire New Act of the Year with his solo stand-up act. He also joined the cast of the Bafta nominated BBC show Sorry, I've Got No Head the same year.

In 2010 he played the role of Devon Mills in BBC2 sitcom Popatron.

In 2011 he played the role of Lionel Putty in CBBC show Hotell Trubble

In 2012, he joined the cast of The Amazing World of Gumball as the character Sussie.

In 2014, Craig published a spoof advice guide, called "Tips For Actors", and in 2021 it was announced that Craig is publishing his first novel, entitled "Once Upon a Crime".

In 2020 Craig created a series of spoof extracts from a crime novel written by the character of Martin Fishback featuring the character of Detective Roger Le Carre. These have spawned two full length novels, plus a pilot for a sitcom.

Filmography
"Get a Grip" (2007) TV series - Various (2007) 
"Comedy: Shuffle" (2007) TV series - Various (unknown episodes, 2007)
"Extras" - Runner (1 episode, 2007, series finale)
"Star Stories" - Nigel Martin-Smith, Declan Donnelly, Russell Brand (11 episodes, 2007-8)
"Mist: Sheepdog Tales" (13 episodes, 2007) 
"EastEnders" - Chip Shop Assistant (1 episode, 22 March 2007)
"After You've Gone" - P.C. Walker (1 episode, 2007, Lock Back in Anger)
"Raging" (2007) (TV) - Various Characters 
"Jonathan Creek" - Paramedic (1 episode, 2004, The Chequered Box)
Hut 33 (radio) - Gordon (18 episodes)
"The Amazing World of Gumball" - Sussie (2012-2016, seasons 2-4) 
"Hoff the Record" (2015-2016, 12 episodes)

Books

References

External links

Living people
1980 births
English male television actors
English male comedians
English male stage actors
Place of birth missing (living people)